A Royal Naval Hospital (RNH) was a hospital operated by the British Royal Navy for the care and treatment of sick and injured naval personnel. A network of these establishments were situated across the globe to suit British interests. They were part of the Royal Naval Medical Service.

No Royal Naval Hospitals survive in operation, although some have become civilian hospitals.

Early history
Individual surgeons had been appointed to naval vessels since Tudor times. During the seventeenth century, the pressures on practitioners grew, as crews began to be exposed to unfamiliar illnesses on increasingly long sea-voyages. One response, as proposed in 1664, was the provision of hospital ships to accompany the fleet on more distant expeditions. Another was the provision of temporary shore-based hospitals, such as those briefly set up during the Anglo-Dutch Wars in such locations as Ipswich, Rochester, Harwich and Plymouth (the latter being established on a more permanent footing in 1689). By the turn of the century, permanent hospital provision was being contemplated for overseas bases; one was set up in Jamaica by Admiral John Benbow in 1701. More were to follow, both at home and abroad.

Head of Royal Navy Hospital
The hospitals were usually administered by a governor appointed by the regulatory boards charged with providing medical services to naval personal.

Examples
Royal Naval Hospitals included:

United Kingdom

 Royal Naval Hospital Haslar, Gosport; opened 1753 as the Royal Hospital Haslar, renamed Royal Naval Hospital in 1954, reverted to Royal Hospital Haslar as the tri-Service Core Hospital in 1996. Having been managed as part of the Portsmouth Hospitals group since 2004, it closed in 2009.
 Royal Naval Hospital, Stonehouse, Plymouth; opened 1760, closed 1995, converted into flats.
 Royal Naval Hospital Great Yarmouth; opened 1793 to serve ships anchoring in Yarmouth Roads, relocated 1815, specialised in psychiatric cases from 1863; transferred to NHS 1958, closed and converted to residential flats 1993.
 Royal Naval Hospital Deal, Kent; opened 1800 to serve naval vessels anchored in The Downs, converted into Royal Marine Barracks in 1863 and occupied by the Royal Naval (later Royal Marine) School of Music from 1930 to 1996.
 Royal Naval Hospital Paignton; opened 1800 to serve the naval anchorage of Tor Bay, closed 1816.
 Melville Hospital, Chatham; opened 1828, replaced by RNH Chatham in 1905, converted into RM barracks extension, demolished c.1960.
 Royal Naval Hospital Chatham (Gillingham, Kent); opened 1905 (replacing an earlier establishment), transferred to NHS 1961, now Medway Maritime Hospital (NHS).
 Royal Naval Hospital, Haulbowline, Ireland; began as a temporary hospital (1820), established on a permanent footing in 1862. Transferred with the rest of the Naval Dockyard to the Irish Government in 1923. 
 Royal Naval Hospital, Portland, Dorset; opened 1901, closed 1957.
 Royal Naval Hospital, Pembroke Dock; opened 1902, expanded by the RAF during World War II, now South Pembrokeshire Hospital.
 Butlaw Naval Hospital, South Queensferry; small hospital opened c.1910 to serve the new Royal Dockyard at Rosyth, expanded during World War I, closed 1928. 
 Royal Naval Hospital Port Edgar opened during World War II.

Overseas
Hospitals were established close to several of the overseas Naval Yards, including:

 Royal Naval Hospital, Port Mahon, Menorca (1711), built on the Illa del Rei in the harbour, ceded to Spain 1782 but remained in use thereafter until c.1960. 
 Royal Naval Hospital, Port Royal, Jamaica (1743) rebuilt 1755 and 1818, closed 1905.
 Old Naval Hospital, Gibraltar (1741) closed in 1922 (and subsequently served as naval married quarters); buildings survive having been converted into housing. 
 Royal Naval Hospital Gibraltar (1963) (established as a Military Hospital in 1903), closed in 2008.
 Royal Naval Hospital, Madras (1745), closed in 1790, new hospital opened 1808, closed 1831 (became a gun-carriage factory).
 Royal Naval Hospital, English Harbour, Antigua (1763) destroyed by a hurricane and rebuilt 1783, closed 1825.
 Royal Naval Hospital, Halifax, Nova Scotia, Canada (1782) rebuilt 1863, closed 1911 (taken over by the Royal Naval College of Canada).
 Royal Naval Hospital, Simon's Town, Cape of Good Hope (1813), rebuilt on higher ground in 1899 (an aerial ropeway provided access from 1904 to 1934), closed 1957. Buildings currently used by South African Navy Band.
 Royal Naval Hospital, Bermuda (1818), closed in 1957, demolished in 1972 (except the zymotic (isolation) block of 1899, which is now an old people's home). In 1976, the world's biggest underwater set, containing a submerged shipwreck sound stage, was built at the site of the demolished main building while filming the movie The Deep. 
 Royal Naval Hospital, Georgetown, Ascension Island (1831) remains in use as a civilian hospital. 
 Royal Naval Hospital, Bighi, Malta (1832), closed 1970.
 Royal Naval Hospital, Mtarfa, Malta (1970) (established as a Military Hospital in 1912), closed 1978.
 Royal Naval Hospital, Esquimalt, British Columbia, Canada (1855) rebuilt 1887–91, closed 1922.
 Royal Naval Hospital, Trincomalee Garrison, Ceylon (present-day Sri Lanka) (1871).
 Royal Naval Hospital, Wanchai, Hong Kong (1873), destroyed 1941 (site became Ruttonjee Hospital).
 New naval hospital (War Memorial Hospital) Hong Kong (1949), closed 1959 (site taken over by the nearby Matilda Hospital).
 Royal Naval Hospital, Yokohama, Japan (1876), (the Hong Kong hospital establishment routinely moved to Yokohama each summer); destroyed in the Great Earthquake of 1923.

Other naval hospitals were established in other overseas locations, usually in the vicinity of other small naval establishments (e.g. coaling or supply yards) including on Long Island, New York (1779), Newfoundland, St Lucia (1783), Kingston, Ontario (1813–14), Barbados (1815), Fernando Po, Mauritius and Wei-Hai-Wei.

Royal Naval Auxiliary Hospitals
During the Second World War around twenty 'R.N. Auxiliary Hospitals' were established in various locations, at home and abroad, on a temporary basis.

Royal Marine Infirmaries
Royal Marine Infirmaries were established near the divisional headquarters in Chatham, Deal, Plymouth, Portsmouth and Woolwich, along with a separate Royal Marine Artillery Infirmary in Portsmouth.

Greenwich
Greenwich Hospital, which predated all the above, was established on somewhat different grounds, as it cared for retired seamen rather than those on active service. Also called the Royal Hospital for Seamen in Greenwich, it was a home for Greenwich pensioners, established in 1692, and although closed at Greenwich in 1869 still exists as a charity. Its buildings housed the Royal Naval College, Greenwich between 1873 and 1998 and are now open to the public as the Old Royal Naval College.

References

Military hospitals in the United Kingdom
Royal Navy Medical Service